BMJ Sexual and Reproductive Health is a quarterly peer-reviewed medical journal covering reproductive health. It was established in 1974 as the Journal of Family Planning Doctors and later renamed British Journal of Family Planning and Journal of Family Planning and Reproductive Health Care before obtaining its current title. 

It is published by BMJ Group on behalf of the Faculty of Sexual and Reproductive Healthcare, of which it is the official journal. The editor-in-chief is Sharon Cameron. According to the Journal Citation Reports, the journal has a 2020 impact factor of 2.151

Abstracting and indexing 
The journal is abstracted and indexed in:

 Index Medicus/MEDLINE/PubMed
 Current Contents/Clinical Medicine
 Current Contents/Social & Behavioural Sciences
 Science Citation Index
 Social Sciences Citation Index
 Google Scholar
 Scopus/EMBASE (Excerpta Medica)

References

External links

Reproductive health journals
BMJ Group academic journals
Publications established in 1974
Quarterly journals
English-language journals